New Kent High School is a public high school located in New Kent, Virginia, east of Richmond. Athletic teams compete in the Virginia High School League's AA Bay Rivers District in Region I.

The school relocated to a new facility for the 2008–2009 school year. Before that, it occupied the location of the current New Kent Middle School, and before that, that of the historic high school. The school is well known as being a state powerhouse in wrestling – taking home the district title for the previous 10 years and securing the programs first state title in 2018.

Accreditation and rankings
New Kent High is fully accredited by the Virginia Department of Education and has been accredited by the Southern Association of Colleges and Schools since 1974.

References

External links

Notable alumni
 Jamion Christian, former Head Coach, Men’s Basketball, George Washington University (DC)
 Jarrell Christian, Head Coach, Maine Celtics

Schools in New Kent County, Virginia
Public high schools in Virginia